Joseph Elvis (14 February 1924 – 3 June 1972) was a Guyanese cricketer. He played in two first-class matches for British Guiana in 1944/45 and 1945/46.

See also
 List of Guyanese representative cricketers

References

External links
 

1924 births
1972 deaths
Guyanese cricketers
Guyana cricketers